Vagabond Blacksmiths (Swedish: Smeder på luffen) is a 1949 Swedish drama film directed by Hampe Faustman and starring Anders Börje, Åke Fridell and Georg Skarstedt. It was shot at the Centrumateljéerna Studios in Stockholm. The film's sets were designed by the art director P.A. Lundgren.

Cast

 Anders Börje as 	Anders Herou
 Åke Fridell as 	Jernberg
 Georg Skarstedt as 	Falk
 John Elfström as 	Fyrström
 Rose-Marie Taikon as 	Käti
 Doris Svedlund as 	Inga Herou
 Gösta Cederlund as Squire
 Pauline Taikon as 	Miriam
 Gunnar Olsson as 	Lind
 Ernst Eklund as 	Kilbom
 Björn Berglund as 	Erik Herou
 Harriett Philipson as 	Britta
 Hampe Faustman as 	Brofelt
 Jan Molander as 	Bolund
 Artur Rolén as Blanke
 Hugo Jacobsson as Britta's Father
 Gustaf Lövås as 	Policeman
 Magnus Kesster as Inspector
 Sture Ericson as 	Tramp
 Sif Ruud as 	Kilbergs-Lina
 Gösta Holmström as 	Verner
 Rune Stylander as 	Policeman
 Werner Ohlson as	Farmer
 Albin Erlandzon as	Kilberg, Lina's father 
 Ivar Wahlgren as 	Hane, smith 
 Axel Högel as Gofeng, smith
 Tord Stål as Police sergeant

References

Bibliography 
 Sundholm, John. Historical Dictionary of Scandinavian Cinema. Scarecrow Press, 2012.

External links 
 

1949 films
Swedish drama films
1949 drama films
1940s Swedish-language films
Films directed by Hampe Faustman
1940s Swedish films